is a former Japanese football player.

Playing career
Kobayashi was born in Tokai, Ibaraki on June 15, 1980. He joined J1 League club Kashima Antlers from youth team in 1999. However he could not play at all in the match. In 2000, he moved to J2 League club Vegalta Sendai on loan. He played many matches as forward. In 2001, he returned to Kashima Antlers. However he could hardly play in the match. In 2002, he moved to J2 club Kawasaki Frontale. Although he played in 2 seasons, he could not play many matches. In 2004, he moved to Mito HollyHock. Although he played as regular player, his opportunity to play decreased in late 2004. In 2005, he moved to newly was promoted to J2 League club, Tokushima Vortis. He played many matches in 3 seasons. In 2008, he moved to Japan Football League (JFL) club Fagiano Okayama. He played as regular player and scored 19 goals. The club was also promoted to J2 from 2009. However his opportunity to play decreased in 2009. In 2010, he moved to Regional Leagues club Fukushima United FC. He played many matches and the club was promoted to JFL in 2013 and J3 League in 2014. He retired end of 2014 season.

Club statistics

References

External links

1980 births
Living people
Association football people from Ibaraki Prefecture
Japanese footballers
J1 League players
J2 League players
J3 League players
Japan Football League players
Kashima Antlers players
Vegalta Sendai players
Kawasaki Frontale players
Mito HollyHock players
Tokushima Vortis players
Fagiano Okayama players
Fukushima United FC players
Association football forwards